The .500/465 Nitro Express is a large bore centerfire rifle cartridge developed by Holland & Holland and introduced in 1907.

Development
The .500/465 Nitro Express is one of several rounds (including the .470 Nitro Express, .475 Nitro Express, .475 No. 2 Nitro Express and .476 Nitro Express) developed as a replacement for the .500/450 Nitro Express following the British authorities' 1907 ban of military caliber ammunition in India and the Sudan, all with comparable performance.

Holland & Holland created the .500/465 Nitro Express by necking down the .500 Nitro Express  in.

The .500/465 Nitro Express is designed for use in single-shot and double rifles.

See also
Nitro Express
12 mm caliber
List of rifle cartridges

References

Footnotes

Bibliography
 Barnes, Frank C. & Amber, John T., Cartridges of the World, DBI Books, Northfield, 1972, .
 Kynoch Ammunition, Big Game Cartridges, kynochammunition.co.uk.(  2015-01-01), retrieved 30 Dec 14.
 Municon, .500/.465 Nitro Express, municion.org (Archived 2015-01-03), retrieved 31 Dec 14.
 Wieland, Terry, Nitro Express: The Big Bang of the Big Bang(  2015-01-01), retrieved 30 Dec 14.

Pistol and rifle cartridges
British firearm cartridges
Holland & Holland cartridges